Pierre Cosso, born Pierre-Alexandre Cosso (24 September 1961 in Algiers), is a French actor and singer-songwriter.

Career
Cosso's first film was the popular teen comedy-drama La Boum 2 (1982), in which he played Sophie Marceau's boyfriend. In the following years, he worked as an actor in film productions in France, Italy and the United States. During that time in the 1980s, he achieved a considerable status as a teen idol in many parts of Europe. Among his most successful roles was the part of Mizio in the romantic comedy Cinderella '80 (1984).

Cosso continued his acting career after the 1980s. In the American film An American Werewolf in Paris (1997) he had a supporting role as the werewolf Claude. He also appeared in leading roles in television productions including Les Cœurs brûlés (1992) and Les Yeux d'Hélène (1994). Between 2000 and 2002, Pierre Cosso played in the theatre production Ladies Night at the Théâtre Rive Gauche in Paris, then on tour. His last acting credit in front of a camera (until at least 2020) was for the Italian television series Anna e i cinque (2008-2011), in which he and Sabrina Ferilli played the leading roles. In August 2019, the actor returned to the stage with the play Nuit d'ivresse, a cult play from the 1980s written by Josiane Balasko. The play he directed sold out at the theater of the Maison de la Culture in Papeete.

Pierre Cosso also recorded several 45s as a singer in the 1980s. The song "Stay", which he sung together with his Cinderella '80-co-star Bonnie Bianco, was successful: When the film was first shown in Germany in 1987, the single reached the No. 1 in the German Singles Charts. He continued his music career in the 2000s by making a radical turn through the "ethnic electro-acoustic" style. In November 2019, the actor returned to music with Le Gang des rêve, a title from the future album signed by the Cosso Gang, a musical group with a pop-rock tendency of which he is the frontman. The band performed in concert on 1 December 2019 in Tahiti and had success there.

Personal life 
The family father Cosso has semi-retired from acting and lives today in his adopted home French Polynesia, where he works as a skipper. He also has an internet blog in which he writes about his life in Polynesia.

Various TV magazines have devoted documentaries to him. In February 2016, he took part in the 11th edition of the Italian version of Dancing with the Stars called Ballando con le stelle.

He also had love affairs with actress Sophie Marceau, the model Nathalie Marquay and the singer Zazie.

Filmography

Film 
 1981 Beau Pere de Bertrand Blier : apparition
 1982 La Boum 2 de Claude Pinoteau : Philippe Berthier
 1984 Cinderella '80  : Mizio
 1984 Windsurf - Il vento nelle mani : Pierre
 1986 Rosa la rose, fille publique : Julien
 1987 Mes quarante premières années (I miei primi 40 anni) de Carlo Vanzina : Massimiliano
 1992 À la vitesse d'un cheval au galop de Fabien Onteniente : le handicapé
 1997 An American Werewolf in Paris de Anthony Waller : Claude
 2000 La Candide Madame Duff de Jean-Pierre Mocky : Nolan
 2003 Instructing the Heart de Giovanni Morricone : Giulio Fontana
 2004 Sin's Kitchen de Fabien Pruvot : Reece

 Television 
 Television films 
 1994 Flics de choc: le dernier baroud de Henri Helman : Beauclair
 1994 Michele alla guerra de Franco Rossi : Bleriot
 1996 Flics de choc : Une femme traquée de Michaëla Watteaux : Beauclair
 1996 Flics de choc : La dernière vague de Arnaud Sélignac : Beauclair
 1998 Le Cœur et l'Épée (Il cuore e la spada) de Fabrizio Costa : Kurvenal
 1999 Mai con i quadri de Mario Caiano :

 Television series 
 1986 Mino : Rico
 1987 Nul ne revient sur ses pas (Nessuno torna indietro) : Maurice
 1988 Très belle et trop naïve (La romana) : Giacomo
 1989 Quattro piccole donne :
 1991 The Adventures of the Black Stallion : Julien
 1992 Les cœurs brûlés : Christian
 1993 Une année en Provence (A Year in Provence) : Abbé Pain
 1993 Charlemagne, le prince à cheval : Olivier
 1994 Les Yeux d'Hélène : Christian
 1994 Extrême Limite : Jean-Paul Mavic
 1995 Les Cordier, juge et flic : Claude (saison 2, épisode 4 Un si joli témoin)
 1996 Troubles (Strangers) : Mia
 1996 Senza cuore :
 1998 Van Loc : un grand flic de Marseille : Pierre Renoir
 2001 72 heures :
 2006 Léa Parker En immersion)
 2008 Anna e i cinque'' : Ferdinando Ferrari

References

Living people
1961 births
French actors
French singer-songwriters
21st-century French actors